RTLup (formerly RTLplus) is a German free-to-air television channel of the RTL Group, which is mainly aimed at female viewers aged 45 and over. Its schedule consists largely of documentary soaps and court shows.

The channel was renamed to RTLup on 15 September 2021 as part of a larger rebranding of all RTL channels.

Audience share

Germany

References

External links
 

Television stations in Germany
Television stations in Austria
Television stations in Switzerland
German-language television stations
Television channels and stations established in 2016
2016 establishments in Germany